A by-election was held for the British House of Commons in the  constituency of Elland on 8 March 1899.

Vacancy
The seat became vacant following the retirement on grounds of ill-health of the sitting Member of Parliament, Thomas Wayman.

Electoral history

Candidates
The Liberal candidate was Charles Philips Trevelyan, opposed by the Unionist Philip Foster.

Campaign
Important issues in the campaign included the Liberal demands for disestablishment of the Church of England, school building, and payment for Members of Parliament. According to The Times, "One of the Unionist placards told the electorate if they wanted their rates and taxes raised, if they wished to pay members of Parliament, and to build Board schools where they were not required, they must vote for Mr Trevelyan; but if they wanted peace, good trade, and their rates and taxes raised, then they ought to vote for Mr Foster".

Result
When the count, which took just two hours and seven minutes, was completed, the result was as expected: a hold for the Liberal Party, with a majority of around three times what it had been in the last election. 

Since the Conservative vote was only slightly less than the last time despite an increase of about 4-500 in the electorate, the Liberals claimed this as a sign that "radicalism was growing right through the West Riding".

Aftermath
Trevelyan would go on to hold the seat until the general election of 1900;

See also
Elland (UK Parliament constituency)
List of United Kingdom by-elections

References 

1899 in England
By-elections to the Parliament of the United Kingdom in West Yorkshire constituencies
1899 elections in the United Kingdom
Elections in Calderdale
19th century in Yorkshire